The Monkey King is the debut novel of Timothy Mo, originally published in London in 1978 by André Deutsch. It was subsequently released through other UK and US publishers – including Faber & Faber (paperback 1978), HarperCollins (hardcover 1978), Random House/Doubleday hardcover (1980), Vintage (softcover, 1993) – before being self-published by the author under the Paddleless Press imprint in 2000. Comic and ironic in style, the novel was chosen by Hilary Bailey of the New Fiction Society and won the Geoffrey Faber Memorial Prize in 1979.

A 10-part abridgement of the novel (by Margaret Busby) was broadcast on BBC Radio 4's Book at Bedtime in 1997, from 23 June to 4 July, read by David Yip.

Synopsis
The Monkey King follows the humorous exploits of protagonist Wallace Nolasco, who finds himself in financial straits after being denied his dowry in hectic post-war Hong Kong, and must by guile better both himself and the moribund reputation of the Chinese house he has married into. The plot of The Monkey King, which is a family saga, divided into three sections, is driven by the tensions between Wallace and his father-in-law, the patriarchal Mr Poon.

Background
In 1993, Mo wrote in The Independent: "The only easy thing about my first novel was traditionally the hardest part, getting it published. Less than a fortnight after delivering the manuscript in May 1977 I received a charming letter of acceptance from Diana Athill of Andre Deutsch, the editor of Jean Rhys and V S Naipaul, no less. I was 26....

Looking back on The Monkey King is as painful and farcical as looking back on first love. ...The South China Morning Post said The Monkey King was 'so bad it should never have been published'; with the headline 'File under nuts'. ...The Jamaican Sunday Gleaner noted that the book beggared description, was full of unintentionally funny passages, and altogether inferior to 'The House of Mr Biswas' (sic) by Naipaul....

It had been monstrously difficult to write.... But ... I've never brought off anything as funny or as sharply characterised as those early scenes from The Monkey King again, nor will I....And Miss Athill still thinks it's my best book.

Mo's novel evoked comparisons with the 16th-century classical Chinese work Journey to the West, and the Los Angeles Times reviewer observed that, "like its illustrious forebear, this 20th-Century tale is at turns comic and serious, sympathetic and cruel, and certainly never dull."

Awards
The Monkey King was awarded the Geoffrey Faber Memorial Prize in 1979.

References

External links
 "The Monkey King (1978)", Fantastic Fiction.
 Elaine Yee Lin Ho, "'The Chinese Family at Home: The Monkey King' in *Timothy Mo*. Manchester University Press. 2000. 29-49.

1978 novels
Postcolonial novels
Novels set in Hong Kong
Fiction set in 1978
Works based on Journey to the West
1978 debut novels
André Deutsch books